Pudian Road is the name of a station on Line 6 of the Shanghai Metro. There is also another station named Pudian Road on Line 4. While these two stations are situated relatively close to each other, the two stations are not interchangeable; they are located along different parts of Pudian Road.

Bus interchange
169, 170, 219, 522, 583, 639, 736, 746, 779, 785, 819, 871, 970, 978, 989, No.9 Tunnel Line, Dongchuan Line, 338, 451, 792, 795, 798, Night Tunnel Line

Exit
There are three exits.

References 

Railway stations in Shanghai
Shanghai Metro stations in Pudong
Railway stations in China opened in 2007
Line 6, Shanghai Metro